Josiomorpha triangulifera is a moth of the subfamily Arctiinae first described by Hering in 1925. It is found in Costa Rica and Panama.

Taxonomy
The species was previously synonymized with Josiomorpha penetrata.

References

Moths described in 1925
Arctiinae